Vincent Costello (24 February 1906 – 22 April 1979) was a South African cricket umpire. He stood in six Test matches between 1957 and 1965.

See also
 List of Test cricket umpires

References

1906 births
1979 deaths
Sportspeople from Cape Town
South African Test cricket umpires